The Longmont Daily Times-Call, known under different combinations of these names, is a daily newspaper published for Longmont, Colorado, United States. It carries local, regional, national and world news and republishes most of its stories from sister publications owned by its parent company. It is part of the MediaNews Group, owned by Digital First Media, which is owned by Alden Global Capital out of New York City. Editorial offices are no longer in Longmont, and in 2017 are located in the Daily Camera offices at 2500 55th St. Suite 210, Boulder, CO 80301.

History
The earliest predecessor of the Daily Times-Call was the Free Press, a newspaper that Elmer and Fred Beckwith published twice in Burlington, Colorado in 1871. In 1872, after the Beckwith brothers had moved to Longmont, Elmer Beckwith started publishing the Longmont Sentinel. The newspaper changed its name to Colorado Press, then Longmont Press. On September 8, 1879, a day after the building with the Longmont Press had burned, Charles Boyton and J.J. Jilson printed the first Longmont Ledger. The burning of the Press building was the lead story. For several weeks the Longmont Ledger also printed the Longmont Press.

The direct predecessors of the Times-Call were founded at the end of the 19th century. In 1887 Elmer Beckwith founded the Longmont Weekly Times, which became the Daily Times in 1893. In 1898 William Forgey founded the Longmont Call. In 1905, George Johnson, who had taken over the Longmont Call, changed it into a daily briefly named The Call. The Daily Times was taken over by Ray Lanyon in 1919, the Call in 1929 by Dr. J.A. Matlack. The Times and Call merged in 1931. Competitor "The Longmont Ledger" was sold in 1969 by co-owners, Lorena Darby and Jerry Archuleta. "The Longmont Ledger's" name was changed to "The Longmont Scene" by the new owners. Ray Lanyon was the publisher of the Daily Times-Call until 1957, and from 1931 to 1942 was also mayor of Longmont.

In 1957 the Daily Times-Call was taken over by attorneys Ed and Ruth Lehman; Ed had journalistic experience. In 1967 the Lehmans bought the Loveland Daily Reporter-Herald and in 1978 they acquired the Cañon City Daily Record, bringing their publications under the ownership of Lehman Communication. In 1985 the Times-Call added a Sunday edition, and in 1998 it became a morning newspaper. Lehman communication was continued by the next generation of the Lehman family. The newspaper group was expanded with the Erie Review, Lafayette News, Louisville Times and Superior Observer, which were combined into the Colorado Hometown Weekly.

Prairie Mountain Publishing, a subsidiary of MediaNews Group, acquired Lehman Communication in 2011. The MediaNews Group acquisition by Digital First Media was announced in December 2013. Corey Hutchins of the Columbia Journalism Review stated that the owner of the Times-Call, Alden Global Capital, "is nationally known for gutting newsrooms." In 2017 the editorial offices moved to Boulder, leaving the newspaper without a Longmont office for the first time in its existence.

In 2019 Hutchins stated that the newspaper "has slimmed down over the years."

References

External links
 Official website

Newspapers published in Colorado
Longmont, Colorado